An exogenote is a piece of donor DNA that is involved in the mating of prokaryotic organisms.

Transferred DNA of Hfr (high frequency of recombination) is called exogenote and homologous part of F (fertility factor) genophore is called endogenote. An exogenote is genetic material that is released into the environment by prokaryotic cells, usually upon their lysis. This exogenous genetic material is then free to be taken up by other competent bacteria, and used as a template for protein synthesis or broken down for its molecules to be used elsewhere in the cell. Taking up genetic material into the cell from the surrounding environment is a form of bacterial transformation. Exogenotes can also be transferred directly from donor to recipient bacteria as an F'-plasmid in a process known as bacterial conjugation. F'-plasmids only form if the F+ factor is incorrectly translated, and results in a small amount of donor DNA erroneously transferring to the recipient with very high efficiency.

References

Genomics
Prokaryotes